Lourmel is a station on line 8 of the Paris Métro in the 15th arrondissement.

The station was opened on 27 July 1937 as part of the extension of line 8 from La Motte-Picquet - Grenelle to Balard.  The station is named after the Rue de Lourmel, named after General , who was killed at the Battle of Inkerman where the Franco-British armies defeated the Russian armies under Alexander Sergeyevich Menshikov during the Crimean War.

Station layout

Gallery

References
Roland, Gérard (2003). Stations de métro. D’Abbesses à Wagram. Éditions Bonneton.

External links

Paris Métro stations in the 15th arrondissement of Paris
Railway stations in France opened in 1937